The Grindavík women's football team, commonly known as Grindavík or UMFG, is the women's football department of the Ungmennafélag Grindavíkur multi-sport club. It is based in Grindavík, Iceland, and currently plays in the Úrvalsdeild kvenna, the top-tier women's football league in Iceland.

References

External links
Official site

Football clubs in Iceland
Úrvalsdeild Women clubs
Grindavik
Women's football in Iceland
Ungmennafélag Grindavíkur